The women's 1000 metres speed skating competition of the 2010 Winter Olympics was held at the Richmond Olympic Oval on 18 February 2010.

Records
Prior to this competition, the existing world and Olympic records were as follows.

Results

References

External links
2010 Winter Olympics results: Ladies' 1000 m, from http://www.vancouver2010.com/; retrieved 2010-02-17.

Women's speed skating at the 2010 Winter Olympics